Srebrenica is a town and municipality located in the easternmost part of Republika Srpska, an entity of Bosnia and Herzegovina. It is a small mountain town, with its main industry being salt mining and a nearby spa. As of 2013, the town has a population of 2,607 inhabitants, while the municipality has 13,409 inhabitants.

During the Bosnian War in 1995, Srebrenica was the site of a massacre of more than 8,000 Bosniak men and boys, which was subsequently designated as an act of genocide by the ICTY and the International Court of Justice.

History

Roman era

Illyrians inhabited Srebrenica and mined the silver in a nearby mine. Silver was also the main reason behind the Roman invasion of the area.

During the Roman times, there was a settlement of Domavia, known to have been near a mine. Silver ore from there was moved to the mints in Salona in the southwest and Sirmium in the northeast using the Via Argentaria. The current settlement of Srebrenica was also known by the Romans as Argentaria.

A Roman tombstone was excavated near Sase Monastery.

Middle Ages
An early Christian church dated to the 6th century was discovered in Srebrenica.

In the 13th and 14th century the region was part of the Banate of Bosnia, and, subsequently, the Bosnian Kingdom.  The earliest reference to the name Srebrenica was in 1376, by which time it was already an important centre for trade in the western Balkans, based especially on the silver mines of the region. (Compare modern srebro "silver".) By that time, a large number of merchants of the Republic of Ragusa were established there, and they controlled the domestic silver trade and the export by sea, almost entirely via the port of Ragusa (Dubrovnik). During the 14th century, many German miners moved into the area.  There were often armed conflicts about Srebrenica because of its mines. According to Czech historian Konstantin Josef Jireček, from 1411 to 1463, Srebrenica switched hands several times, being Hungarian one time, Serbian five times, Bosnian four times, and Ottoman three times. The mines of Bosnian Podrinje and Usora were part of the Serbian Despotate prior to the Ottoman conquest.

Ottoman period

With the town coming under Ottoman rule, becoming less influenced by the Republic of Ragusa, the economic importance of Srebrenica went into decline, as did the proportion of Christians in the population. The Franciscan church of St. Nicholas was converted into the White Mosque, but the large number of Catholics, Ragusan and Saxon, caused the transformation of the town to Islam to be slower than in most of the other towns in the area.

The area of Osat was liberated for a short time during the First Serbian Uprising (1804–13), under the leadership of Kara-Marko Vasić from Crvica. Upon the breakout of the uprising, Metropolitan Hadži Melentije Stevanović contacted Vasić, who met with the rebel leadership. After participating in battles on the Drina (1804), Vasić asked Karađorđe for an army to liberate Osat; Lazar Mutap was dispatched and the region came under rebel rule. In 1808, the Ottomans cleared out Osat, and by 1813, the rebels left the region.

Austro-Hungarian period

The town came under Austro-Hungarian rule in 1878, when the Congress of Berlin approved the occupation of the Bosnia Vilayet, which later in 1908 became a condominium under the joint control of Austria and Hungary. The natural mineral water springs Crni Guber ("Black Guber") developed into an important part of the local economy. The Bohemian company Mattoni established a distribution infrastructure to tap and export the water named Guber-Quelle ("Guber Spring") throughout the monarchy and abroad. The construction of a spa was recommended. Modern infrastructure such as administration, electricity, roads, schools, telephone, healthcare, a postal service and other things were introduced.

Although the Austrian rulers tried to stop the spread of nationalism and favoured a multi-religious and multi-cultural makeup with religious tolerance under their hegemony, Serbian nationalism was viewed with suspicion and hostility, since it demanded a unification of Bosnia with Serbia. As modern education raised the levels of general literacy, ideas spread through the advent of newspapers and publications. The region became increasingly restless as nationalism spread to all groups.

During the First World War, one of the region's main battle areas was in Eastern Bosnia and the Drina, from where the units of Austria-Hungary advanced towards the Kingdom of Serbia. In late summer 1914 Srebrenica was taken over by Serbian volunteers under Kosta Todorović but later retaken by Austro-Hungarian units. Following World War I, Bosnia was incorporated into the South Slav kingdom of Serbs, Croats and Slovenes, which later was renamed Yugoslavia.

Second World War
During the Second World War there were many atrocities committed by the Chetniks and Ustashas. Partisans fought Chetniks and Ustashe during the war and the people of Srebrenica built a partisan memorial cemetery monument for the fallen victims.

Yugoslav period
Tourism gained importance during the communist Yugoslav period and wellness spa and taking to the waters became an important part of the local economy. The Banja Guber was constructed for that purpose.  Up to the 1990s over 90,000 overnight stays were recorded and an annual income of about three million dollars generated.

Bosnian War

The town of Srebrenica came to international prominence as a result of events during the Bosnian War (1992–1995). The strategic objectives proclaimed by the secessionist Bosnian Serb presidency included the creation of a border separating the Serb people from Bosnia's other ethnic communities and the abolition of the border along the River Drina separating Serbia and the Bosnian Serbs' Republika Srpska. The Bosnian Muslim/Bosniak majority population of the Drina Valley posed a major obstacle to the achievement of these objectives. In the early days of the campaign of forcible transfer (ethnic cleansing) that followed the outbreak of war in April 1992 the town of Srebrenica was occupied by Serb/Serbian forces. It was subsequently retaken by Bosniak resistance groups. Refugees expelled from towns and villages across the central Drina valley sought shelter in Srebrenica, swelling the town's population.

The town and its surrounding area was surrounded and besieged by Serb forces. On 16 April 1993, the United Nations declared the Bosnian Muslim/Bosniak enclave a UN safe area, to be "free from any armed attack or any other hostile act", and guarded by a small Dutch unit operating under the mandate of United Nations Protection Force (UNPROFOR), which did not get permission to use force from the UN, which they needed to defend the local population.

Srebrenica and the other UN safe areas of Žepa and Goražde were isolated pockets of Bosnian government-held territory in eastern Bosnia. In July 1995, despite the town's UN-protected status, it was attacked and captured by the Army of Republika Srpska led by general Ratko Mladic. Following the town's capture, all men of fighting age who fell into Bosnian Serb hands were massacred in a systematically organised series of summary executions. The women of the town and men below 12 years of age and above 65 were transferred by bus to Tuzla. The Srebrenica massacre was the deadliest massacre in Europe since World War II, being the only incident in Europe to have been recognized as a genocide since the Holocaust.

In 2001, the Srebrenica massacre was determined by judgement of the International Criminal Tribunal for the former Yugoslavia (ICTY) to have been a crime of genocide (confirmed on appeal in 2004). This finding was upheld in 2007 by the International Court of Justice. The decision of the ICTY was followed by an admission to and an apology for the massacre by the Republika Srpska government.

Under the 1995 Dayton Agreement which ended the Bosnian War, Srebrenica was included in the territory assigned to Bosnian Serb control as the Republika Srpska entity of Bosnia and Herzegovina. Although guaranteed under the provisions of the Dayton Agreement, the return of survivors was repeatedly obstructed. In 2007, verbal and physical attacks on returning refugees continued to be reported in the region around Srebrenica.

Fate of Bosnian Muslim villages
In 1992, Bosniak villages around Srebrenica were under constant attacks by Serb forces. The Bosnian Institute in the United Kingdom has published a list of 296 villages destroyed by Serb forces around Srebrenica three years before the genocide and in the first three months of war (April–June 1992):

According to the Naser Orić trial judgement:

British Army documents declassified in 2019

The British National Archives in Kew released the documents dating back to July 1995 which deal with communication between British military and political actors during the Bosnian war. Several of the reports appear to blame the Bosniak Army (BiH) for provoking the Srebrenica attack. British intelligence doubted that Pale (Bosnian Serb headquarters) had any plans to overrun Srebrenica. Instead, the manoeuvre came as a response due to repeated Bosniak Army (BiH) attacks on BSA (Bosnian Serb Army) supply lines.

When Serbs entered the town, General Mladić threatened to shell the Dutch camp if UN troops did not disarm Bosniak troops. However, the report confirms no Bosniak army soldiers remained at the camp, all 2,000 armed Muslims "had simply left during the night" in the direction of Tuzla.

Post-war period
The town has a religious makeup of roughly half Muslim and half Orthodox. Most of the town's 23 mosques that were destroyed were reconstructed with donations and aid, also from abroad.

Unemployment rates are high since the economy was destroyed and reconstruction progresses slowly, as in many parts of the country. There are plans to revive the mineral water and spa business again. The reconstruction of the Banja Guber was scheduled for 2019 but experienced delays.

Politics
In 2007, Srebrenica's municipal assembly adopted a resolution demanding independence from the Republika Srpska entity (although not from Bosnia's sovereignty); the Serb members of the assembly did not vote on the resolution. In the 2016 elections Mladen Grujičić, a Bosnian Serb and native of the town of Srebrenica, was elected as mayor.

The municipality emblem was developed during the Yugoslav period and depicts a red and white stylised "S" with a depiction of the mineral water spring in the lower middle and a tree in the upper middle. The spring underscores the historical importance to the town's economy and the tree the nature and forests of the region.

Local communities
The municipality (општина or opština) is further subdivided into the following local communities (мјесне заједнице or mjesne zajednice):

Brežani
Crvica
Donji Potočari
Gornji Potočari
Gostilj
Kostolomci
Brezova Njiva
Krnići
Luka
Orahovica
Osatica
Podravanje
Radoševići
Ratkovići
Sase
Skelani
Skenderovići
Srebrenica
Sućeska
Toplica
Viogor

Demographics

Population

Ethnic composition

The borders of the municipality in the 1953 and 1961 census were different. In 1953, a distinctive Muslim nationality had been yet to emerge as an ethnicity, leading Slavic Muslims to identify as Yugoslavs. As Yugoslav was itself not adopted in 1948, they were classified as other and while many self-identified as “Serbs” or “Croats”. Until 1961 census, the municipality of Srebrenica included today's territory of Bratunac municipality. The ethnic composition of the municipality:

Culture

 Sase Monastery, Serbian Orthodox monastery dating back to 13th century 
 White Mosque, dating to 17th century, on the foundations of a Franciscan Catholic church 
 Čaršija mosque, built or rebuilt in 1836 by Selmanaga Selmanagic. Rebuilt in 1988, demolished in 1995, rebuilt in 2011 by Ahmed Smajlovic.
 various other mosques such as the Red Mosque 
 Church of the Intercession of the Holy Virgin (Srebrenica), dating to 1903 
 St Mary's Catholic Chapel
 local museum
 Mosque youth center (Omladinski centar), completed in 2019 in neo-Ottoman style
 mineral water springs and spa

Economy

Before 1992, there was a metal factory in the town, and lead, zinc, and gold mines nearby. The town's name (Srebrenica) means "silver mine", the same meaning of its old Latin name Argentaria.

Before the war, Srebrenica also had a big spa and the town prospered from wellness tourism from the Crni Guber ("Black Guber") ferruginous spring water and other springs. Nowadays, Srebrenica has some tourism but a lot less developed than before the war. Currently, a pension, motel and a hostel are operating in the town.

Economic preview
The following table gives a preview of total number of registered people employed in legal entities per their core activity (as of 2018):

Notable people
 Selman Selmanagić (b. 1905), Bosnian-German architect from the Bauhaus school
 Milorad Simić (b. 1946), philologist
 Desnica Radivojević (born 1952), Bosnian politician
 Sabahudin Vugdalić (born 1953), Bosnian sports journalist and former football goalkeeper
 Naser Orić (b. 1967), Bosnian military officer during Bosnian war 1992–1995 
 Emir Suljagić (b. 1975), author
 Hamza Alić (b. 1979), shot putter
 Muamer Jahić (born 1979), Bosnian footballer
 Mladen Grujičić (born 1982), Bosnian Serb politician and mayor of Srebrenica
 Sanin Muminović (born 1990), Croatian footballer
 Esmir Ahmetović (born 1991), Bosnian footballer 
 Mirsad Bektić (b. 1991), Bosnian-American UFC fighter
 Asmir Suljić (b. 1991), footballer
 Mirzad Mehanović (born 1993), Bosnian footballer
 Kadir Hodžić (born 1994), Bosnian footballer
 Emir Sulejmanović (b. 1995), basketball player

References

Sources

External links

Opština Srebrenica – Srebrenica municipality 
The Advocacy Project partners with Bosnian Family (BOSFAM)
Fiction stories about Srebrenica women: Integration Under the Midnight Sun  by Adnan Mahmutovic

Movie about Srebrenica (nominated for Oscar)
Quo vadis, Aida?

 
Municipalities of Republika Srpska
Populated places in Srebrenica
Spa towns